Bradyrhizobium ingae is a bacterium from the genus of Bradyrhizobium which has been isolated from the nodules of the tree Inga laurina in Cerrado in Brazil.

References

Nitrobacteraceae
Bacteria described in 2014